Warren Canning (10 June 1927 – 3 October 2012) was an  Australian rules footballer who played with Geelong in the Victorian Football League (VFL).

Notes

External links 

1927 births
2012 deaths
Australian rules footballers from Melbourne
Geelong Football Club players
Bendigo Football Club players